Jason Lowe (born February 20, 1974) is an American politician from the U.S. State of Oklahoma. He has served in the Oklahoma House of Representatives from the 97th district since 2016.

Oklahoma House of Representatives (2016-Present)
Representative Lowe served in the 56th Oklahoma Legislature, 57th Oklahoma Legislature, and 58th Oklahoma Legislature.

58th Legislature
In 2021, Representative Lowe wrote a letter to the 86th United States Attorney General Merrick Garland requesting the United States Justice Department intercede in the operations of the Oklahoma County Detention Center.

References

1974 births
Living people
Democratic Party members of the Oklahoma House of Representatives
21st-century American politicians
African-American state legislators in Oklahoma